Windsor School District can refer to:
 Windsor C-1 School District (Missouri)
 Windsor School District (New Hampshire)
 Windsor School District (Vermont)